Gunther von Fritsch (15 July 1906, Pula – 27 August 1988, Pasadena) was an American film director born in the Austro-Hungarian Empire.

Biography
Gunther von Fritsch was born 15 July 1906 in Pula. He studied in Paris, and in 1930 moved to the United States. During World War II, he entered the United States Army Signal Corps. After the war, he directed training films for the State Department in West Berlin.

Von Fritsch died of a stroke in Pasadena 27 August 1988.

Filmography
(incomplete)

References

External links
 

1906 births
1988 deaths
American film directors
Yugoslav emigrants to the United States
Yugoslav expatriates in France
United States Army personnel of World War II